Yuzbashi Chay, is a village in Kuhgir Rural District, Tarom Sofla District.
 Yuzbashi Kandi, is a village in Obatu Rural District, Karaftu District.
 Tazeh Kand-e Yuzbashi, is a village in Meshgin-e Gharbi Rural District.
 Yuz Bashi 
 Yuz Bashi, North Khorasan 
 Yuzbash Mahallehsi